The White Masai is a 2005 film directed by Hermine Huntgeburth and starring Nina Hoss and Jacky Ido. The screenplay concerns Carola, a woman who falls in love in Kenya with Maasai Lemalian. The film is based on an autobiographical novel of the same name by the German born writer Corinne Hofmann. In the film version, names have been changed from those in the novel.

Plot
Carola (Hoss), a German woman living in Switzerland, is on holiday with her boyfriend in Kenya. She falls in love with Maasai warrior Lemalian (Ido), who is visiting dressed in the clothing of his area. At the airport on the way home she decides to stay. It turns out that Lemalian has gone to his home village in the Samburu District. Carola travels to the area, and stays at the house of another European woman. Lemalian hears about her stay and comes to meet her.  Eventually they start living together.

She travels to Switzerland to sell her shop there, promising Lemalian to come back to him. She does, and they marry and have a daughter. Carola buys a car and starts a shop. They lose money on the shop because Lemalian gives too much credit to friends and neighbors, and because they have to pay bribes to the mini-chief. Lemalian argues that this is no problem because she has more money in Switzerland.

The mini-chief demands that Carola hires his teenage nephew as a shop assistant. She has to accept this although she does not need him and he does not work hard. After some time, when he is just drinking beer and not working, she fires him. Later he returns and attacks her. A local judge rules that she has to pay two goats for firing him, but the boy's family has to pay her five goats to compensate for the attack.

Carola is frustrated by the female circumcision being practiced in the village. She wants to stop it, but it is a long tradition that is not easily changed.

When Carola helps a pregnant woman in labour with a breech birth, Lemalian refuses to assist because the woman is supposedly bewitched.

Lemalian does not want Carola to be friendly with other men, even if she is just serving a customer in a friendly way. He is very jealous and suspicious of Carola having a boyfriend. He even wants to kill a man he suspects.

Carola wants to return to Switzerland with her daughter, stating she needs a two-week holiday. After some hesitation, Lemalian signs a form giving Carola consent to take the girl out of Kenya, although he suspects that she will not return.

Thematic content 
The themes of the film have been controversial.  Ultimately, the film is about the clash of cultures and worldviews. Two individuals who believe that their worldview is superior and therefore right (thus Carola condemns female circumcision because it does not fit her cultural outlook while Lemalian cannot understand how she could talk to men without being unfaithful to him), and it is their inability to understand the other that brings about their misery, separation, and divorce.

References

External links
 
 
 Production notes
 

2005 films
2005 romantic drama films
2000s English-language films
Films based on biographies
Films based on Swiss novels
Films shot in Kenya
Films set in Kenya
2000s German-language films
German romantic drama films
Films about interracial romance
Swahili-language films
Films shot in Germany
2000s German films